Park Ki-Won (born 25 August 1951) is a South Korean former volleyball player who competed in the 1972 Summer Olympics and in the 1976 Summer Olympics.
He played for Korea from 1972–78, competing at the 1972 and 1976 Olympic Games. Park won a gold medal at the 1978 Asian Games in Thailand and was a member of the Korean team that finished fourth at the 1978 World Championship in Italy. Highlights of his coaching include taking Iran's men's team to a silver medal at the 2002 Asian Games and a bronze at the following year's Asian Championship. In 2013 he led the Korean men's team to a silver medal at the Asian Championship.

References

1951 births
Living people
South Korean men's volleyball players
Olympic volleyball players of South Korea
Volleyball players at the 1972 Summer Olympics
Volleyball players at the 1976 Summer Olympics
Asian Games medalists in volleyball
Volleyball players at the 1974 Asian Games
Volleyball players at the 1978 Asian Games
Medalists at the 1974 Asian Games
Medalists at the 1978 Asian Games
Asian Games gold medalists for South Korea
Asian Games silver medalists for South Korea
South Korean volleyball coaches
21st-century South Korean people